Musa is the second largest village in Harzo Chaach, located northern section of Attock, in the Punjab Province of Pakistan.

The village is located 2 km from Hazro. It is famous due to peanuts, the main crop of village.

References

Villages in Attock District